A mechanician is an engineer or a scientist working in the field of mechanics, or in a related or sub-field: engineering or computational mechanics, applied mechanics, geomechanics, biomechanics, and mechanics of materials.  Names other than mechanician have been used occasionally, such as mechaniker and mechanicist.

The term mechanician is also used by the Irish Navy to refer to junior engine room ratings. In the British Royal Navy, Chief Mechanicians and Mechanicians 1st Class were Chief Petty Officers, Mechanicians 2nd and 3rd Class were Petty Officers, Mechanicians 4th Class were Leading Ratings, and Mechanicians 5th Class were Able Ratings. The rate was only applied to certain technical specialists and no longer exists.

In the New Zealand Post Office, which provided telephone service prior to the formation of Telecom New Zealand in 1987, "Mechanician" was a job classification for workers who serviced telephone exchange switching equipment. The term seems to have originated in the era of the 7A Rotary system exchange, and was superseded by "Technician" circa 1975, perhaps because "Mechanician" was no longer considered appropriate after the first 2000 type Step-byStep Strowger switch exchanges began to be introduced in 1952 (in Auckland, at Birkenhead exchange).

It is also the term by which makers of mechanical automata use in reference to their profession.

People who made lasting contributions to mechanics prior to the 20th century
Ibn al-Haytham: motion
Galileo Galilei: notion of strength
Robert Hooke: Hooke's law
Isaac Newton: Newton's laws, law of gravitation
Guillaume Amontons: laws of friction
Leonhard Euler: buckling, rigid body dynamics
Jean le Rond d'Alembert: d'Alembert's principle, Wave equation
Joseph Louis Lagrange: Lagrangian mechanics
Pierre-Simon Laplace: effects of surface tension
Sophie Germain: elasticity
Siméon Denis Poisson: elasticity
Claude-Louis Navier: elasticity, fluid mechanics
Augustin Louis Cauchy: elasticity
Barré de Saint-Venant:  elasticity
William Rowan Hamilton: Hamiltonian mechanics
George Gabriel Stokes: fluid mechanics
Gustav Kirchhoff: theory of plates
Josiah Willard Gibbs: thermodynamics
Heinrich Rudolf Hertz: contact mechanics

People who made lasting contributions to mechanics and died during or after the 20th century
Ludwig Burmester: theory of linkages
Carlo Alberto Castigliano: Elasticity (physics)
Ludwig Prandtl: Fluid mechanics, Plasticity
Stephen Timoshenko:  author of many lasting textbooks, father of modern applied mechanics
Theodore von Karman: Fluid mechanics, Structural instability
Richard Edler von Mises: Plasticity
Geoffrey Ingram Taylor:  Fluid mechanics, theory of dislocations.
Alan Arnold Griffith: founder of Fracture mechanics
George Rankine Irwin: father of modern Fracture mechanics
Warner T. Koiter: Solid mechanics, Structural instability
John D. Eshelby: inclusion in elastic body

Honors and awards
by European Mechanics Society , 
 Euromech Fellow 
 Solid and Fluid Mechanics Prizes 

by Applied Mechanics Division, American Society of Mechanical Engineers 
 Timoshenko Medal
 Koiter Medal
 Drucker Medal
Thomas K. Caughey Dynamics Award
Ted Belytschko Applied Mechanics Award
Thomas J.R. Hughes Young Investigator Award 

by American Society of Civil Engineers 
 Theodore von Karman Medal, ASCE

by Society of Engineering Science, Inc.
 Eringen Medal
 William Prager Medal in Solid Mechanics
 G. I. Taylor Medal in Fluid Mechanics

Footnotes

See also
 Applied mechanics
 Mechanics
 Geomechanics
 Biomechanics
 Materials Science and Engineering
 Structural analysis
 Fluid Mechanics

External links
iMechanica, news and views of interest to mechanicians and their friends.
Homepage of the ASME International Applied Mechanics Division
Mathematics Genealogy Project
Mechanician Career Description
The MacTutor History of Mathematics archive

Mechanics